Daughter of the Bride is a 2023 American comedy film written by Karen Bloch Morse, directed by Annette Haywood-Carter and starring Marcia Gay Harden, Halston Sage, Andrew Richardson and Aidan Quinn.

Cast
Marcia Gay Harden as Diane
Halston Sage as Kate
Andrew Richardson as Josh
Aidan Quinn as Bruce

Production
In June 2022, it was announced that Harden, Sage, Richardson and Quinn were cast in film, which had entered production at the time.  The film was shot in Cranford, New Jersey.

Release
The film was released in select theaters in New York City, Los Angeles, Cleveland, Atlanta and Boston on February 3, 2023.  It was also released on Digital HD and On Demand the same day.

References

External links